Gustav Aurisch was a German swimmer. He competed in the men's 100 metre backstroke event at the 1908 Summer Olympics.

References

External links
 

Year of birth missing
Year of death missing
Olympic swimmers of Germany
Swimmers at the 1908 Summer Olympics
Place of birth missing
German male backstroke swimmers